Highland Chatino is an indigenous Mesoamerican language, one of the Chatino family of the Oto-Manguean languages. Dialects are rather diverse; Ethnologue 16 counts them as three languages as follows:

Eastern Highland Chatino (Lachao-Yolotepec dialect)
Western Chatino (Yaitepec, Panixtlahuaca, and Quiahije dialects)
Nopala Chatino

Neighboring dialects between the three groups are about 80% mutually intelligible; diversity among the three Western dialects is almost as great. 

For phonological and grammatical details, see Chatino languages, which includes examples from Yaitepec dialect.

Phonology

Zacatepec Chatino 
There are nine vowel sounds both oral and nasal:

 /o/ can be heard as [ɔ] when followed by a glottal /ʔ/.

 Consonants in parentheses only exist as a result of Spanish loanwords.
 When following a nasal segment, the consonants /p, t, t̻, t͡s, t͡ʃ, k, kʷ/ can be voiced to [b, d, d̻, d͡z, d͡ʒ, ɡ, ɡʷ].
 /l, l̻/ have rare voiceless allophones of [l̥, l̻̥], when following a glottal /h/.
 /w/ can have allophones of [β, b, ʍ]. [β] before front vowels, [b] before a /j/, and [ʍ] when following a /h/.
 /n/ can assimilate to a velar [ŋ], when preceding a velar /k, kʷ/.

Yaitepec Chatino 
Yaitepec Chatino has the following phonemic consonants (Rasch 2002):

 Sounds /d͡z, ʒ/ only rarely occur.
 Other fricative sounds /ð, ɣ/ may also appear as a result of Spanish loanwords.
 /hʷ/ is heard as a labio-dental [f] when preceding consonants.
 Nasals when preceding consonants, are heard as syllabic [n̩, m̩].
 A bilabial nasal /m/ can also be written as nw orthographically. When nw is preceding a /k/, it is pronounced as [ŋʷ], elsewhere; it is heard as [m].
 /w/ can be heard as a bilabial fricative [β], when preceding sounds /j, i, e/ in word-initial position.
 /n/ assimilates as [ŋ] when preceding velar consonants /k, ɡ/.
 /k/ is heard as [kʲ] when preceding /e/.
 /j/ is heard as voiceless [j̊] when preceding a voiceless consonant.

 An extra schwa sound  is heard in between consonants.

Rasch (2002) reports ten distinct tones for Yaitepec Chatino.  , mid , low-mid , and low .  There are also two rising tones (/˦˥/ and /˨˦/) and three falling tones as well as a more limited falling tone , found in a few lexical items and in a few Completive forms of verbs.

Orthography
There are a variety of practical orthographies for Chatino, most based on Spanish orthography.

In Quiahije Chatino, and perhaps more broadly across Highland Chatino, superscript capitals A–L are used as lexical tone letters: , with additional letters for tone sandhi.

References

 Rasch, Jeffrey Walker. 2002. The basic morpho-syntax of Yaitepec Chatino.  Ph.D. thesis.  Rice University.

External links

Chatino languages